Andrej Startsev (born 7 June 1994) is a Kazakh footballer who plays as a right back for FC Rot-Weiß Erfurt.

Club career 
Startsev played for Hannover 96 in his youth . [5] In 2010 he moved from SC Langenhagen to the youth of FC St. Pauli , where he moved up from youth in 2012. On October 3, 2012, Startsev made his debut for the second team in the 2–3 defeat by SV Wilhelmshaven in the Regionalliga Nord . He scored his first goal on March 24, 2014 in a 4-0 win at SV Meppen .

On September 23, 2014, Startsev made his first appearance for the first team in the 2nd Bundesliga when he played the full time in the 1-0 win against Eintracht Braunschweig . After the 2015/16 season he left the club.

In early September 2016, Startsev joined regional league club TSV Havelse , for whom he made 26 appearances, scoring two goals.

For the 2017/18 season, Startsev moved to Energie Cottbus in the Northeast Regional League . He received a contract valid until the end of the season, which was extended by a year after promotion to the 3rd division . [2] After the 2018/19 season, Startsev left the club.

In September 2019 he joined VfB Oldenburg . After one season, Startsev moved to FC Rot-Weiss Erfurt .

National Team 
In March 2015, Startsev expressed a desire to play for Kazakhstan [4] and was invited to a training camp of the Kazakh U21 national team in Estonia . On March 25, 2015 he came in the 0-3 friendly defeat against Finland for the first time. [7] In total, he played three times for the U21 team.

References

External links
 

Living people
1994 births
Kazakhstani footballers
German footballers
Association football defenders
Kazakhstan under-21 international footballers
2. Bundesliga players
3. Liga players
FC St. Pauli II players
FC St. Pauli players
TSV Havelse players
FC Energie Cottbus players
VfB Oldenburg players
FC Rot-Weiß Erfurt players
People from Pavlodar